Louis XVI, sometimes known as "The Last"  (Louis-Auguste; 23 August 175421 January 1793) was the last King of France before the fall of the monarchy during the French Revolution. He was addressed as Citizen Louis Capet during the four months before he was executed by guillotine. 

The son of Louis, Dauphin of France, son and heir-apparent of King Louis XV, and Maria Josepha of Saxony, Louis became the new Dauphin when his father died in 1765. On his grandfather's death on 10 May 1774, he became King of France and Navarre, reigning until 4 September 1791, when he received the title of King of the French, reigning as king until the monarchy was abolished on 21 September 1792.

The first part of his reign was marked by attempts to reform the French government in accordance with Enlightenment ideas. These included efforts to abolish serfdom, remove the taille (land tax) and the corvée (labour tax), and increase tolerance toward non-Catholics as well as abolish the death penalty for deserters. The French nobility reacted to the proposed reforms with hostility, and successfully opposed their implementation. Louis implemented deregulation of the grain market, advocated by his economic liberal minister Turgot, but it resulted in an increase in bread prices. In periods of bad harvests, it led to food scarcity which, during a particularly bad harvest in 1775, prompted the masses to revolt. From 1776, Louis XVI actively supported the North American colonists, who were seeking their independence from Great Britain, which was realised in the 1783 Treaty of Paris. The ensuing debt and financial crisis contributed to the unpopularity of the Ancien Régime. This led to the convening of the Estates-General of 1789. Discontent among the members of France's middle and lower classes resulted in strengthened opposition to the French aristocracy and to the absolute monarchy, of which Louis and his wife Queen Marie Antoinette were viewed as representatives. Increasing tensions and violence were marked by events such as the storming of the Bastille, during which riots in Paris forced Louis to definitively recognize the legislative authority of the National Assembly.

Louis's indecisiveness and conservatism led some elements of the people of France to view him as a symbol of the perceived tyranny of the Ancien Régime, and his popularity deteriorated progressively. His unsuccessful flight to Varennes in June 1791, four months before the constitutional monarchy was declared, seemed to justify the rumors that the king tied his hopes of political salvation to the prospects of foreign intervention. The credibility of the king was deeply undermined, and the abolition of the monarchy and the establishment of a republic became an ever-increasing possibility. The growth of anti-clericalism among revolutionaries resulted in the abolition of the dîme (religious land tax) and several government policies aimed at the dechristianization of France.

In a context of civil and international war, Louis XVI was suspended and arrested at the time of the Insurrection of 10 August 1792. One month later, the monarchy was abolished and the First French Republic was proclaimed on 21 September 1792. Louis was then tried by the National Convention (self-instituted as a tribunal for the occasion), found guilty of high treason and executed by guillotine on 21 January 1793, as a desacralized French citizen under the name of Citizen Louis Capet, in reference to Hugh Capet, the founder of the Capetian dynasty – which the revolutionaries interpreted as Louis's surname. Louis XVI was the only king of France ever to be executed, and his death brought an end to more than a thousand years of continuous French monarchy. Both of his sons died in childhood, before the Bourbon Restoration; his only child to reach adulthood, Marie Thérèse, was given over to the Austrians in exchange for French prisoners of war, eventually dying childless in 1851.

Childhood
 

Louis-Auguste de France, who was given the title Duc de Berry at birth, was born in the Palace of Versailles on 23 August 1754. One of seven children, he was the second surviving son of Louis, the Dauphin of France and the grandson of Louis XV of France and of his consort, Maria Leszczyńska. His mother was Marie-Josèphe of Saxony, the daughter of Augustus III, Prince-Elector of Saxony and King of Poland and Archduchess Maria Josepha of Austria.

Louis-Auguste was overlooked by his parents who favored his older brother, Louis, Duc de Bourgogne, who was regarded as bright and handsome but died at the age of nine in 1761. Louis-Auguste, a strong and healthy boy but very shy, excelled in his studies and had a strong taste for Latin, history, geography, and astronomy and became fluent in Italian and English. He enjoyed physical activities such as hunting with his grandfather and rough play with his younger brothers, Louis-Stanislas, Comte de Provence, and Charles-Philippe, Comte d'Artois. From an early age, Louis-Auguste was encouraged in another of his interests, locksmithing, which was seen as a useful pursuit for a child.

When his father died of tuberculosis on 20 December 1765, the eleven-year-old Louis-Auguste became the new Dauphin. His mother never recovered from the loss of her husband and died on 13 March 1767, also from tuberculosis. The strict and conservative education he received from the Duc de La Vauguyon, "gouverneur des Enfants de France" (governor of the Children of France), from 1760 until his marriage in 1770, did not prepare him for the throne that he was to inherit in 1774 after the death of his grandfather, Louis XV. Throughout his education, Louis-Auguste received a mixture of studies particular to religion, morality, and humanities. His instructors may have also had a good hand in shaping Louis-Auguste into the indecisive king that he became. Abbé Berthier, his instructor, taught him that timidity was a value in strong monarchs, and Abbé Soldini, his confessor, instructed him not to let people read his mind.

Marriage and family life

On 16 May 1770, at the age of fifteen, Louis-Auguste married the fourteen-year-old Habsburg Archduchess Maria Antonia (better known by the French form of her name, Marie Antoinette), his second cousin once removed and the youngest daughter of the Holy Roman Emperor Francis I and his wife, the empress Maria Theresa.

This marriage was met with hostility from the French public. France's alliance with Austria had pulled the country into the disastrous Seven Years' War, in which it was defeated by the British and the Prussians, both in Europe and in North America. By the time that Louis-Auguste and Marie Antoinette were married, the French people generally disliked the Austrian alliance, and Marie Antoinette was seen as an unwelcome foreigner. For the young couple, the marriage was initially amiable but distant. Louis-Auguste's shyness and, among other factors, the young age and inexperience of the newlyweds (who were near total strangers to each other: they had met only two days before their wedding) meant that the fifteen-year-old bridegroom failed to consummate the union with his fourteen-year-old bride. His fear of being manipulated by her for Imperial purposes caused him to behave coldly towards her in public. Over time, the couple became closer, though while their marriage was reportedly consummated in July 1773, it did not actually happen until 1777.

The couple's failure to produce any children for several years placed a strain upon their marriage, exacerbated by the publication of obscene pamphlets (libelles) mocking their infertility. One questioned, "Can the King do it? Can't the King do it?".

The reasons for the couple's initial failure to have children were debated at that time, and they have continued to be debated since. One suggestion is that Louis-Auguste suffered from a physiological dysfunction, most often thought to be phimosis, a suggestion first made in late 1772 by the royal doctors. Historians adhering to this view suggest that he was circumcised (a common treatment for phimosis) to relieve the condition seven years after their marriage. Louis's doctors were not in favour of the surgery – the operation was delicate and traumatic, and capable of doing "as much harm as good" to an adult male. The argument for phimosis and a resulting operation is mostly seen to originate from Stefan Zweig's 1932 biography of Marie Antoinette.

Most modern historians agree that Louis had no surgery – for instance, as late as 1777, the Prussian envoy, Baron Goltz, reported that the King of France had definitely declined the operation. Louis was frequently declared to be perfectly capable of sexual intercourse, as confirmed by Joseph II, and during the time he was supposed to have had the operation, he went out hunting almost every day, according to his journal. This would not have been possible if he had undergone a circumcision; at the very least, he would have been unable to ride to the hunt for a few weeks afterwards. The couple's sexual problems are now attributed to other factors. Antonia Fraser's biography of the queen discusses Joseph II's letter on the matter to one of his brothers after he visited Versailles in 1777. In the letter, Joseph describes in astonishingly frank detail Louis's inadequate performance in the marriage bed and Marie Antoinette's lack of interest in conjugal activity. Joseph described the couple as "complete fumblers"; however, with his advice, Louis began to apply himself more effectively to his marital duties, and in the third week of March 1778 Marie Antoinette became pregnant.

Eventually, the royal couple became the parents of four children. According to Madame Campan, Marie Antoinette's lady-in-waiting, the queen also suffered two miscarriages. The first one, in 1779, a few months after the birth of her first child, is mentioned in a letter to her daughter, written in July by Empress Maria Theresa. Madame Campan states that Louis spent an entire morning consoling his wife at her bedside, and swore to secrecy everyone who knew of the occurrence. Marie Antoinette suffered a second miscarriage on the night of 2–3 November 1783.

Louis XVI and Marie Antoinette were the parents of four live-born children:
 Marie-Thérèse-Charlotte (19 December 1778 – 19 October 1851)
 Louis-Joseph-Xavier-François, the Dauphin (22 October 1781 – 4 June 1789)
 Louis-Charles, Dauphin after the death of his elder brother, future titular king Louis XVII of France (27 March 1785 – 8 June 1795)
 Sophie-Hélène-Béatrix, died in infancy (9 July 1786 – 19 June 1787)
In addition to his biological children, Louis XVI also adopted six children: "Armand" Francois-Michel Gagné (c. 1771–1792), a poor orphan adopted in 1776; Jean Amilcar (c. 1781–1796), a Senegalese slave boy given to the queen as a present by Chevalier de Boufflers in 1787, but whom she instead had freed, baptized, adopted and placed in a pension; Ernestine Lambriquet (1778–1813), daughter of two servants at the palace, who was raised as the playmate of his daughter and whom he adopted after the death of her mother in 1788; and finally "Zoe" Jeanne Louise Victoire (born in 1787), who was adopted in 1790 along with her two older sisters when her parents, an usher and his wife in service of the king, had died.

Of these, only Armand, Ernestine and Zoe actually lived with the royal family: Jean Amilcar, along with the elder siblings of Zoe and Armand who were also formally foster children of the royal couple, simply lived on the queen's expense until her imprisonment, which proved fatal for at least Amilcar, as he was evicted from the boarding school when the fee was no longer paid, and reportedly starved to death on the street. Armand and Zoe had a position which was more similar to that of Ernestine: Armand lived at court with the king and queen until he left them at the outbreak of the revolution because of his republican sympathies, and Zoe was chosen to be the playmate of the Dauphin, just as Ernestine had once been selected as the playmate of Marie Thérèse, and sent away to her sisters in a convent boarding school before the Flight to Varennes in 1791.

Absolute monarch of France (1774–1789)

When Louis XVI acceded to the throne in 1774, he was nineteen years old. He had an enormous responsibility, as the government was deeply in debt, and resentment of despotic monarchy was on the rise. He himself felt woefully unqualified to resolve the situation.

As king, Louis XVI focused primarily on religious freedom and foreign policy. While none doubted his intellectual ability to rule France, it was quite clear that, although raised as the Dauphin since 1765, he lacked firmness and decisiveness. His desire to be loved by his people is evident in the prefaces of many of his edicts that would often explain the nature and good intention of his actions as benefiting the people, such as reinstating the parlements. When questioned about his decision, he said, "It may be considered politically unwise, but it seems to me to be the general wish and I want to be loved." In spite of his indecisiveness, Louis XVI was determined to be a good king, stating that he "must always consult public opinion; it is never wrong." He, therefore, appointed an experienced advisor, Jean-Frédéric Phélypeaux, Comte de Maurepas who, until his death in 1781, would take charge of many important ministerial functions.

Among the major events of Louis XVI's reign was his signing of the Edict of Versailles, also known as the Edict of Tolerance, on 7 November 1787, which was registered in the parlement on 29 January 1788. Granting non-Roman Catholics – Huguenots and Lutherans, as well as Jews – civil and legal status in France and the legal right to practice their faiths, this edict effectively nullified the Edict of Fontainebleau that had been law for 102 years. The Edict of Versailles did not legally proclaim freedom of religion in France – this took two more years, with the Declaration of the Rights of Man and of the Citizen of 1789 – however, it was an important step in eliminating religious tensions and it officially ended religious persecution within his realm.

Economic policies 
Radical financial reforms by Turgot and Malesherbes angered the nobles and were blocked by the parlements who insisted that the King did not have the legal right to levy new taxes. So, in 1776, Turgot was dismissed and Malesherbes resigned, to be replaced by Jacques Necker. Necker supported the American Revolution, and he carried out a policy of taking out large international loans instead of raising taxes. He attempted to gain public favor in 1781 by publishing of the first ever accounting of the French Crown's expenses and accounts, the Compte-rendu au Roi. This misleading publication led the people of France to believe the kingdom ran a modest surplus. When this policy of hiding and ignoring the kingdom's financial woes failed miserably, Louis dismissed and replaced him in 1783 with Charles Alexandre de Calonne, who increased public spending to "buy" the country's way out of debt. Again this failed, so Louis convoked the Assembly of Notables in 1787 to discuss a revolutionary new fiscal reform proposed by Calonne. When the nobles were informed of the true extent of the debt, they were shocked and rejected the plan.

After this, Louis XVI and his new contrôleur général des finances, Étienne-Charles de Loménie de Brienne, tried to simply force the Parlement de Paris to register the new laws and fiscal reforms. Upon the refusal of the members of the Parlement, Louis XVI tried to use his absolute power to subjugate them by every means: enforcing in many occasions the registration of his reforms (6 August 1787, 19 November 1787, and 8 May 1788), exiling all Parlement magistrates to Troyes as a punishment on 15 August 1787, prohibiting six members from attending parliamentary sessions on 19 November, arresting two very important members of the Parlement, who opposed his reforms, on 6 May 1788, and even dissolving and depriving of all power the "Parlement," replacing it with a plenary court, on 8 May 1788. The failure of these measures and displays of royal power is attributable to three decisive factors. First, the majority of the population stood in favor of the Parlement against the King, and thus continuously rebelled against him. Second, the royal treasury was financially destitute to a crippling degree, leaving it incapable of sustaining its own imposed reforms. Third, although the King enjoyed as much absolute power as his predecessors, he lacked the personal authority crucial for absolutism to function properly. Now unpopular to both the commoners and the aristocracy, Louis XVI was therefore only very briefly able to impose his decisions and reforms, for periods ranging from 2 to 4 months, before having to revoke them.

As authority dissipated from him and reforms were clearly becoming unavoidable, there were increasingly loud calls for him to convoke the Estates-General, which had not met since 1614 (at the beginning of the reign of Louis XIII). As a last-ditch attempt to get new monetary reforms approved, Louis XVI convoked the Estates-General on 8 August 1788, setting the date of their opening on 1 May 1789. With the convocation of the Estates-General, as in many other instances during his reign, Louis XVI placed his reputation and public image in the hands of those who were perhaps not as sensitive to the desires of the French population as he was. Because it had been so long since the Estates-General had been convened, there was some debate as to which procedures should be followed. Ultimately, the Parlement de Paris agreed that "all traditional observances should be carefully maintained to avoid the impression that the Estates-General could make things up as it went along." Under this decision, the king agreed to retain many of the traditions which had been the norm in 1614 and prior convocations of the Estates-General, but which were intolerable to a Third Estate buoyed by recent proclamations of equality. For example, the First and Second Estates proceeded into the assembly wearing their finest garments, while the Third Estate was required to wear plain, oppressively somber black, an act of alienation that Louis XVI would likely have not condoned. He seemed to regard the deputies of the Estates-General with respect: in a wave of self-important patriotism, members of the Estates refused to remove their hats in the King's presence, so Louis removed his to them.

This convocation was one of the events that transformed the general economic and political malaise of the country into the French Revolution. In June 1789, the Third Estate unilaterally declared itself the National Assembly. Louis XVI's attempts to control it resulted in the Tennis Court Oath (serment du jeu de paume), on 20 June, the declaration of the National Constituent Assembly on 9 July, and eventually to the storming of the Bastille on 14 July, which started the French Revolution. Within three short months, the majority of the king's executive authority had been transferred to the elected representatives of the Nation.

Royal spending
Royal household spending in 1788 was 13% of total state expenses (excluding interest on debts).

Foreign policy

French involvement in the Seven Years' War had left Louis XVI a disastrous inheritance. Britain's victories had seen them capture most of France's colonial territories. While some were returned to France at the 1763 Treaty of Paris, a vast swath of North America was ceded to the British.

This had led to a strategy amongst the French leadership of seeking to rebuild the French military in order to fight a war of revenge against Britain, in which it was hoped the lost colonies could be recovered. France still maintained a strong influence in the West Indies, and in India maintained five trading posts, leaving opportunities for disputes and power-play with Great Britain.

Concerning the American Revolution and Europe

In the spring of 1776, Vergennes, the Foreign Secretary, saw an opportunity to humiliate France's long-standing enemy, Great Britain, and to recover territory lost during the Seven Years' War, by supporting the American Revolution. In the same year Louis was persuaded by Pierre Beaumarchais to send supplies, ammunition, and guns to the rebels secretly. Early in 1778 he signed a formal Treaty of Alliance, and later that year France went to war with Britain. In deciding in favor of war, despite France's large financial problems, the King was materially influenced by alarmist reports after the Battle of Saratoga, which suggested that Britain was preparing to make huge concessions to the thirteen colonies and then, allied with them, to strike at French and Spanish possessions in the West Indies. Spain and the Netherlands soon joined the French in an anti-British coalition. After 1778, Great Britain switched its focus to the West Indies, as defending the sugar islands was considered more important than trying to recover the thirteen colonies. France and Spain planned to invade the British Isles themselves with the Armada of 1779, but the operation never went ahead.

France's initial military assistance to the American rebels was a disappointment, with defeats at Rhode Island and Savannah. In 1780, France sent Rochambeau and Grasse to help the Americans, along with large land and naval forces. The French expeditionary force arrived in North America in July 1780. The appearance of French fleets in the Caribbean was followed by the capture of a number of the sugar islands, including Tobago and Grenada. In October 1781, the French naval blockade was instrumental in forcing a British army under Cornwallis to surrender at the Siege of Yorktown. When news of this reached London in March 1782, the government of Lord North fell and Great Britain immediately sued for peace terms; however, France delayed the end of the war until September 1783 in the hope of overrunning more British colonies in India and the West Indies.Great Britain recognized the independence of the thirteen colonies as the United States of America, and the French war ministry rebuilt its army. However, the British defeated the main French fleet in 1782 and successfully defended Jamaica and Gibraltar. France gained little from the 1783 Treaty of Paris that ended the war, except the colonies of Tobago and Senegal. Louis XVI was wholly disappointed in his aims of recovering Canada, India, and other islands in the West Indies from Britain, as they were too well defended and the Royal Navy made any attempted invasion of mainland Britain impossible. The war cost 1,066 million livres, financed by new loans at high interest (with no new taxes). Necker concealed the crisis from the public by explaining only that ordinary revenues exceeded ordinary expenses, and not mentioning the loans. After he was forced from office in 1781, new taxes were levied.

This intervention in America was not possible without France adopting a neutral position in European affairs to avoid being drawn into a continental war which would be simply a repetition of the French policy mistakes in the Seven Years' War. Vergennes, supported by King Louis, refused to go to War to support Austria in the Bavarian Succession crisis in 1778, when Austrian Holy Roman Emperor Joseph tried to control parts of Bavaria. Vergennes and Maurepas refused to support the Austrian position, but the intervention of Marie Antoinette in favor of Austria obliged France to adopt a position more favorable to Austria, which in the treaty of Teschen was able to get in compensation a territory whose population numbered around 100,000 persons. However, this intervention was a disaster for the image of the Queen, who was named "l'Autrichienne" (a pun in French meaning "Austrian", but the "chienne" suffix can mean "bitch") on account of it.

Concerning Asia

Louis XVI hoped to use the American Revolutionary War as an opportunity to expel the British from India. In 1782, he sealed an alliance with the Peshwa Madhu Rao Narayan. As a consequence, Bussy moved his troops to the Isle de France (now Mauritius) and later contributed to the French effort in India in 1783. Suffren became the ally of Hyder Ali in the Second Anglo-Mysore War against the British East India Company from 1782 to 1783, engaging the Royal Navy along the coasts of India and Ceylon.

France also intervened in Cochinchina following Mgr Pigneau de Béhaine's intervention to obtain military aid. A France-Cochinchina alliance was signed through the Treaty of Versailles of 1787, between Louis XVI and Prince Nguyễn Ánh.

Louis XVI also encouraged major voyages of exploration. In 1785, he appointed La Pérouse to lead a sailing expedition around the world. (La Pérouse and his fleet disappeared after leaving Botany Bay in March 1788. Louis is recorded as having asked, on the morning of his execution, "Any news of La Pérouse?".)

Revolutionary constitutional reign (1789–1792)
There is a lack of scholarship on the subject of Louis XVI's time as a constitutional monarch, though it was a significant length of time. The reason as to why many biographers have not elaborated extensively on this time in the king's life is due to the uncertainty surrounding his actions during this period, as Louis XVI's declaration that was left behind in the Tuileries stated that he regarded his actions during constitutional reign provisional; he reflected that his "palace was a prison". This time period was exemplary in its demonstration of an institution's deliberation while in their last standing moments.

Louis XVI's time in his previous palace came to an end on 5 October 1789, when an angry mob of Parisian working men and women was incited by revolutionaries and marched on the Palace of Versailles, where the royal family lived. At dawn, they infiltrated the palace and attempted to kill the queen, who was associated with a frivolous lifestyle that symbolized much that was despised about the Ancien Régime. After the situation had been defused by Lafayette, head of the Garde nationale, the king and his family were brought by the crowd to the Tuileries Palace in Paris, the reasoning being that the king would be more accountable to the people if he lived among them in Paris.

The Revolution's principles of popular sovereignty, though central to democratic principles of later eras, marked a decisive break from the centuries-old principle of divine right that was at the heart of the French monarchy. As a result, the Revolution was opposed by many of the rural people of France and by all the governments of France's neighbors. Still, within the city of Paris and amongst the philosophers of the time, many of which were members of the National Assembly, the monarchy had next to no support. As the Revolution became more radical and the masses more uncontrollable, several of the Revolution's leading figures began to doubt its benefits. Some, like Honoré Mirabeau, secretly plotted with the Crown to restore its power in a new constitutional form.

Beginning in 1791, Montmorin, Minister of Foreign Affairs, started to organize covert resistance to the revolutionary forces. Thus, the funds of the Liste Civile, voted annually by the National Assembly, were partially assigned to secret expenses in order to preserve the monarchy. Arnault Laporte, who was in charge of the Civil list, collaborated with both Montmorin and Mirabeau. After the sudden death of Mirabeau, Maximilien Radix de Sainte-Foix, a noted financier, took his place. In effect, he headed a secret council of advisers to Louis XVI, which tried to preserve the monarchy; these schemes proved unsuccessful, and were exposed later when the armoire de fer was discovered. Regarding the financial difficulties facing France, the Assembly created the Comité des Finances, and while Louis XVI attempted to declare his concern and interest in remedying the economic situations, inclusively offering to melt crown silver as a dramatic measure, it appeared to the public that the king did not understand that such statements no longer held the same meaning as they did before and that doing such a thing could not restore the economy of a country.

Mirabeau's death on 7 April, and Louis XVI's indecision, fatally weakened negotiations between the Crown and moderate politicians. The Third Estate leaders also had no desire in turning back or remaining moderate after their hard efforts to change the politics of the time, and so the plans for a constitutional monarchy did not last long. On one hand, Louis was nowhere near as reactionary as his brothers, the comte de Provence and the comte d'Artois, and he repeatedly sent messages to them requesting a halt to their attempts to launch counter-coups. This was often done through his secretly nominated regent, the Cardinal Loménie de Brienne. On the other hand, Louis was alienated from the new democratic government both by its negative reaction to the traditional role of the monarch and in its treatment of him and his family. He was particularly irked by being kept essentially as a prisoner in the Tuileries, and by the refusal of the new regime to allow him to have confessors and priests of his choice rather than 'constitutional priests' pledged to the state and not the Roman Catholic Church.

Flight to Varennes (1791)

On 21 June 1791, Louis XVI attempted to flee secretly with his family from Paris to the royalist fortress town of Montmédy on the northeastern border of France, where he would join the émigrés and be protected by Austria. The voyage was planned by the Swedish nobleman, and often assumed secret lover of Queen Marie-Antoinette, Axel von Fersen.
 
While the National Assembly worked painstakingly towards a constitution, Louis and Marie-Antoinette were involved in plans of their own. Louis had appointed Breteuil to act as plenipotentiary, dealing with other foreign heads of state in an attempt to bring about a counter-revolution. Louis himself held reservations against depending on foreign assistance. Like his mother and father, he thought that the Austrians were treacherous and the Prussians were overly ambitious. As tensions in Paris rose and he was pressured to accept measures from the Assembly against his will, Louis XVI and the queen plotted to secretly escape from France. Beyond escape, they hoped to raise an "armed congress" with the help of the émigrés, as well as assistance from other nations with which they could return and, in essence, recapture France. This degree of planning reveals Louis's political determination, but it was for this determined plot that he was eventually convicted of high treason. He left behind (on his bed) a 16-page written manifesto, Déclaration du roi, adressée à tous les François, à sa sortie de Paris, traditionally known as the Testament politique de Louis XVI ("Political Testament of Louis XVI"), explaining his rejection of the constitutional system as illegitimate; it was printed in the newspapers. However, his indecision, many delays, and misunderstanding of France were responsible for the failure of the escape. Within 24 hours, the royal family was arrested at Varennes-en-Argonne shortly after Jean-Baptiste Drouet, who recognised the king from his profile on a 50 livres assignat (paper money), had given the alert. Louis XVI and his family were taken back to Paris where they arrived on 25 June. Viewed suspiciously as traitors, they were placed under tight house arrest upon their return to the Tuileries.

At the individual level, the failure of the escape plans was due to a series of misadventures, delays, misinterpretations, and poor judgments. In a wider perspective, the failure was attributable to the king's indecision—he repeatedly postponed the schedule, allowing for smaller problems to become severe. Furthermore, he totally misunderstood the political situation. He thought only a small number of radicals in Paris were promoting a revolution that the people as a whole rejected. He thought, mistakenly, that he was beloved by his subjects. The king's flight in the short term was traumatic for France, inciting a wave of emotions that ranged from anxiety to violence to panic. Everyone realized that war was imminent. The deeper realization, that the king had in fact repudiated the Revolution, was an even greater shock for people who until then had seen him as a good king who governed as a manifestation of God's will. They felt betrayed, and as a result, Republicanism now burst out of the coffee houses and became a dominating philosophy of the rapidly radicalized French Revolution.

Intervention by foreign powers

The other monarchies of Europe looked with concern upon the developments in France, and considered whether they should intervene, either in support of Louis or to take advantage of the chaos in France. The key figure was Marie-Antoinette's brother, the Holy Roman Emperor Leopold II. Initially, he had looked on the Revolution with equanimity. However, he became more and more disturbed as it became more and more radical. Despite this, he still hoped to avoid war.

On 27 August, Leopold and Frederick William II of Prussia, in consultation with émigrés French nobles, issued the Declaration of Pillnitz, which declared the interest of the monarchs of Europe in the well-being of Louis and his family, and threatened vague but severe consequences if anything should befall them. Although Leopold saw the Pillnitz Declaration as an easy way to appear concerned about the developments in France without committing any soldiers or finances to change them, the revolutionary leaders in Paris viewed it fearfully as a dangerous foreign attempt to undermine France's sovereignty.

In addition to the ideological differences between France and the monarchical powers of Europe, there were continuing disputes over the status of Austrian estates in Alsace, and the concern of members of the National Constituent Assembly about the agitation of émigrés nobles abroad, especially in the Austrian Netherlands and the minor states of Germany.

In the end, the Legislative Assembly, supported by Louis XVI, declared war on Austria ("the King of Bohemia and Hungary") first, voting for war on 20 April 1792, after a long list of grievances was presented to it by the foreign minister, Charles François Dumouriez. Dumouriez prepared an immediate invasion of the Austrian Netherlands, where he expected the local population to rise against Austrian rule. However, the Revolution had thoroughly disorganised the army, and the forces raised were insufficient for the invasion. The soldiers fled at the first sign of battle and, in one case, on 28 April 1792, murdered their general, Irish-born comte Théobald de Dillon, whom they accused of treason.

While the revolutionary government frantically raised fresh troops and reorganised its armies, a Prussian-Austrian army under Charles William Ferdinand, Duke of Brunswick assembled at Coblenz on the Rhine. In July, the invasion began, with Brunswick's army easily taking the fortresses of Longwy and Verdun. The duke then issued on 25 July a proclamation called the Brunswick Manifesto, written by Louis's émigré cousin, the Prince de Condé, declaring the intent of the Austrians and Prussians to restore the king to his full powers and to treat any person or town who opposed them as rebels to be condemned to death by martial law.

Contrary to its intended purpose of strengthening Louis XVI's position against the revolutionaries, the Brunswick Manifesto had the opposite effect of greatly undermining his already highly tenuous position. It was taken by many to be the final proof of collusion between the king and foreign powers in a conspiracy against his own country. The anger of the populace boiled over on 10 August when an armed mob – with the backing of a new municipal government of Paris that came to be known as the Insurrectional Paris Commune – marched upon and invaded the Tuileries Palace. The royal family took shelter with the Legislative Assembly.

Imprisonment, execution and burial (1792–1793)

Louis was officially arrested on 13 August 1792 and sent to the Temple, an ancient fortress in Paris that was used as a prison. On 21 September, the National Assembly declared France to be a republic, and abolished the monarchy. Louis was stripped of all of his titles and honors, and from this date was known as Citoyen Louis Capet.

The Girondins were partial to keeping the deposed king under arrest, both as a hostage and a guarantee for the future. Members of the Commune and the most radical deputies, who would soon form the group known as the Mountain, argued for Louis's immediate execution. The legal background of many of the deputies made it difficult for a great number of them to accept an execution without the due process of law, and it was voted that the deposed monarch be tried before the National Convention, the organ that housed the representatives of the sovereign people. In many ways, the former king’s trial represented the trial of the monarchy by the Revolution. It was seen as if with the death of one came the life of the other. The historian Jules Michelet later argued that the death of the former king led to the acceptance of violence as a tool for happiness. He said, "If we accept the proposition that one person can be sacrificed for the happiness of the many, it will soon be demonstrated that two or three or more could also be sacrificed for the happiness of the many. Little by little, we will find reasons for sacrificing the many for the happiness of the many, and we will think it was a bargain."

Two events led up to the trial for Louis XVI. First, after the Battle of Valmy on 22 September 1792, General Dumouriez negotiated with the Prussians who evacuated France. Louis could no longer be considered a hostage or as leverage in negotiations with the invading forces. Second, in November 1792, the armoire de fer (iron chest) incident took place at the Tuileries Palace, when the existence of the hidden safe in the king's bedroom containing compromising documents and correspondence, was revealed by François Gamain, the Versailles locksmith who had installed it. Gamain went to Paris on 20 November and told Jean-Marie Roland, Girondinist Minister of the Interior, who ordered it opened. The resulting scandal served to discredit the king. Following these two events the Girondins could no longer keep the king from trial.

On 11 December, among crowded and silent streets, the deposed king was brought from the Temple to stand before the convention and hear his indictment, an accusation of high treason and crimes against the State. On 26 December, his counsel, Raymond Desèze, delivered Louis's response to the charges, with the assistance of François Tronchet and Malesherbes. Before the trial started and Louis mounted his defense to the convention, he told his lawyers that he knew he would be found guilty and be killed, but to prepare and act as though they could win. He was resigned to and accepted his fate before the verdict was determined, but he was willing to fight to be remembered as a good king for his people.

The convention would be voting on three questions: first, is Louis guilty; second, whatever the decision, should there be an appeal to the people; and third, if found guilty, what punishment should Louis suffer? The order of the voting on each question was a compromise within the Jacobin movement between the Girondins and Mountain; neither were satisfied but both accepted.

On 15 January 1793, the convention, composed of 721 deputies, voted on the verdict. Given the overwhelming evidence of Louis's collusion with the invaders, the verdict was a foregone conclusion – with 693 deputies voting guilty, none for acquittal, with 23 abstaining. The next day, a roll-call vote was carried out to decide upon the fate of the former king, and the result was uncomfortably close for such a dramatic decision. 288 of the deputies voted against death and for some other alternative, mainly some means of imprisonment or exile. 72 of the deputies voted for the death penalty, but subject to several delaying conditions and reservations. The voting took a total of 36 hours. 361 of the deputies voted for Louis's immediate execution. Louis was condemned to death by a majority of one vote. Philippe Égalité, formerly the Duke of Orléans and Louis' cousin, voted for Louis's execution, a cause of much future bitterness among French monarchists; he would himself be guillotined on the same scaffold, Place de la Révolution, before the end of the same year, on 6 November 1793.

The next day, a motion to grant Louis XVI reprieve from the death sentence was voted down: 310 of the deputies requested mercy, but 380 voted for the immediate execution of the death penalty. This decision would be final. Malesherbes wanted to break the news to Louis and bitterly lamented the verdict, but Louis told him he would see him again in a happier life and he would regret leaving a friend like Malesherbes behind. The last thing Louis said to him was that he needed to control his tears because all eyes would be upon him.

On 21 January 1793, Louis XVI, at age 38, was beheaded by guillotine on the Place de la Révolution. As Louis XVI mounted the scaffold, he appeared dignified and resigned. He delivered a short speech in which he pardoned "...those who are the cause of my death.... ". He then declared himself innocent of the crimes of which he was accused, praying that his blood would not fall back on France. Many accounts suggest Louis XVI's desire to say more, but Antoine Joseph Santerre, a general in the National Guard, halted the speech by ordering a drum roll. The former king was then quickly beheaded. Some accounts of Louis's beheading indicate that the blade did not sever his neck entirely the first time. There are also accounts of a blood-curdling scream issuing from Louis after the blade fell but this is unlikely, since the blade severed Louis' spine. The executioner, Charles-Henri Sanson, testified that the former king had bravely met his fate.

Immediately after his execution, Louis XVI's corpse was transported in a cart to the nearby Madeleine cemetery, located rue d'Anjou, where those guillotined at the Place de la Révolution were buried in mass graves. Before his burial, a short religious service was held in the Madeleine church (destroyed in 1799) by two priests who had sworn allegiance to the Civil Constitution of the Clergy. Afterward, Louis XVI, his severed head placed between his feet, was buried in an unmarked grave, with quicklime spread over his body. The Madeleine cemetery was closed in 1794. In 1815 Louis XVIII had the remains of his brother Louis XVI and of his sister-in-law Marie Antoinette transferred and buried in the Basilica of St Denis, the Royal necropolis of the Kings and Queens of France. Between 1816 and 1826, a commemorative monument, the Chapelle expiatoire, was erected at the location of the former cemetery and church.

While Louis's blood dripped to the ground, several onlookers ran forward to dip their handkerchiefs in it. This account was proven true in 2012 after a DNA comparison linked blood thought to be from Louis XVI's beheading to DNA taken from tissue samples originating from what was long thought to be the mummified head of his ancestor, Henry IV of France. The blood sample was taken from a squash gourd carved to commemorate the heroes of the French Revolution that had, according to legend, been used to house one of the handkerchiefs dipped in Louis's blood.

Legacy

Reputation
The 19th-century historian Jules Michelet attributed the restoration of the French monarchy to the sympathy that had been engendered by the execution of Louis XVI. Michelet's Histoire de la Révolution Française and Alphonse de Lamartine's Histoire des Girondins, in particular, showed the marks of the feelings aroused by the revolution's regicide. The two writers did not share the same sociopolitical vision, but they agreed that, even though the monarchy was rightly ended in 1792, the lives of the royal family should have been spared. Lack of compassion at that moment contributed to a radicalization of revolutionary violence and to greater divisiveness among Frenchmen. For the 20th century novelist Albert Camus the execution signaled the end of the role of God in history, for which he mourned. For the 20th century philosopher Jean-François Lyotard the regicide was the starting point of all French thought, the memory of which acts as a reminder that French modernity began under the sign of a crime.

Louis's daughter, Marie-Thérèse-Charlotte, the future Duchess of Angoulême, survived the French Revolution, and she lobbied in Rome energetically for the canonization of her father as a saint of the Catholic Church. Despite his signing of the "Civil Constitution of the Clergy", Louis had been described as a martyr by Pope Pius VI in 1793. In 1820, however, a memorandum of the Congregation of Rites in Rome, declaring the impossibility of proving that Louis had been executed for religious rather than political reasons, put an end to hopes of canonization.

Other commemorations of Louis XVI include:
 The Requiem in C minor for mixed chorus by Luigi Cherubini was written in 1816, in memory of Louis XVI.
 Paul Wranitzky's Symphony Op. 31 (1797), which is themed on the events of the French Revolution, includes a section titled "The Funeral March for the Death of the King Louis XVI".
 The city of Louisville, Kentucky, is named for Louis XVI. In 1780, the Virginia General Assembly bestowed this name in honor of the French king, whose soldiers were aiding the American side in the Revolutionary War. At that time, Kentucky was a part of the Commonwealth of Virginia. Kentucky became the 15th State of the United States in 1792.

In film
King Louis XVI has been portrayed in numerous films. In Captain of the Guard (1930), he is played by Stuart Holmes. In Marie Antoinette (1938), he was played by Robert Morley. Jean-François Balmer portrayed him in the 1989 two-part miniseries La Révolution française. More recently, he was depicted in the 2006 film Marie Antoinette by Jason Schwartzman. In Sacha Guitry's Si Versailles m'était conté, Louis was portrayed by one of the film's producers, Gilbert Bokanowski, using the alias Gilbert Boka. Several portrayals have upheld the image of a bumbling, almost foolish king, such as that by Jacques Morel in the 1956 French film Marie-Antoinette reine de France and that by Terence Budd in the Lady Oscar live action film. In Start the Revolution Without Me, Louis XVI is portrayed by Hugh Griffith as a laughable cuckold. Mel Brooks played a comic version of Louis XVI in The History of the World Part 1, portraying him as a libertine who has such distaste for the peasantry he uses them as targets in skeet shooting. In the 1996 film Ridicule; Urbain Cancelier plays Louis.

In literature
Louis XVI has been the subject of novels as well, including two of the alternate histories anthologized in If It Had Happened Otherwise (1931): "If Drouet's Cart Had Stuck" by Hilaire Belloc and "If Louis XVI Had Had an Atom of Firmness" by André Maurois, which tell very different stories but both imagine Louis surviving and still reigning in the early 19th century. Louis appears in the children's book Ben and Me by Robert Lawson but does not appear in the 1953 animated short film based on the same book.

Ancestry
Larmuseau et al. (2013) tested the Y-DNA of three living members of the House of Bourbon, one descending from Louis XIII of France via King Louis Philippe I, and two from Louis XIV via Philip V of Spain, and concluded that all three men share the same STR haplotype and belonged to haplogroup R1b (R-M343). The three individuals were further assigned to sub-haplogroup R1b1b2a1a1b* (R-Z381*). These results contradicted an earlier DNA analysis of a handkerchief dipped in the presumptive blood of Louis XVI after his execution performed by Laluez-Fo et al. (2010).

Arms

References

Bibliography

 Baecque, Antoine De. "From Royal Dignity to Republican Austerity: the Ritual for the Reception of Louis XVI in the French National Assembly (1789–1792)." Journal of Modern History 1994 66(4): 671–696. JSTOR.org 
 Burley, Peter. "A Bankrupt Regime." History Today (January 1984) 34:36–42. Fulltext in EBSCO
 Doyle, William. Origins of the French Revolution (3rd ed. 1999) online
 Doyle, William. "The Execution of Louis XVI and the End of the French Monarchy." History Review. (2000) pp 21+ *  Pages 194–196 deal with the trial of Louis XVI.
 Doyle, William, ed. Old Regime France (2001).
 Dunn, Susan. The Deaths of Louis XVI: Regicide and the French Political Imagination. (1994). 178 pp.
 Hardman, John. Louis XVI: The Silent King (2nd ed. 2016) 500 pages; much expanded new edition; now the standard scholarly biography
 Hardman, John. Louis XVI: The Silent King (1994) 224 pages, an older scholarly biography
 Hardman, John. French Politics, 1774–1789: From the Accession of Louis XVI to the Fall of the Bastille. (1995). 283 pp.
 Jones, Colin. The Great Nation: France from Louis XV to Napoleon (2002) Amazon.com , excerpt and text search
  See Chapter VI, The National Convention, for more details on the king's trial and execution.
 Padover, Saul K. The Life and Death of Louis XVI (1939) 
 Price, Munro. The Road from Versailles: Louis XVI, Marie Antoinette, and the Fall of the French Monarchy (2004) 425 pp. Amazon.com , excerpt and text search; also published as The Fall of the French Monarchy: Louis XVI, Marie Antoinette and the Baron de Breteuil. (2002)
 Schama, Simon. Citizens. A Chronicle of the French Revolution (1989), highly readable narrative by scholar Amazon.com , excerpt and text search
 Tackett, Timothy. When the King Took Flight. (2003). 270 pp. Amazon.com , excerpt and text search

Historiography
McGill, Frank N. "Execution of Louis XVI" in McGill's History of Europe (1993) 3:161-4
Moncure, James A. ed. Research Guide to European Historical Biography: 1450–Present (4 vol 1992) 3:1193–1213
Rigney, Ann. "Toward Varennes." New Literary History 1986 18(1): 77–98 in JSTOR , on historiography

Primary sources
 
 Full text of writings of Louis XVI  in Ball State University's Digital Media Repository.

External links

 Full text of writings of Louis XVI in Ball State University's Digital Media Repository
 

 
1754 births
1793 deaths
18th-century kings of France
18th-century Princes of Andorra
Ancien Régime
Burials at the Basilica of Saint-Denis
Dauphins of France
Dukes of Berry
Executed monarchs
Knights of the Golden Fleece of Spain
Leaders ousted by a coup
French people executed by guillotine during the French Revolution
French people of Portuguese descent
People executed for treason against France
Princes of Andorra
Princes of France (Bourbon)
Publicly executed people
Recipients of the Order of Saint Lazarus
18th-century peers of France
Dethroned monarchs
Heads of government who were later imprisoned
Navarrese titular monarchs
Legitimist pretenders to the French throne
Royal reburials